American Legion Hall, at 219 W. Legion Way in Olympia, Washington, was built in 1921.  It served as a meeting hall and as a sport facility.  It was listed on the National Register of Historic Places in 1987.  The concrete, stucco and brick structure was designed by Joseph Wohleb.

References

American Legion buildings
Buildings and structures in Olympia, Washington
Clubhouses on the National Register of Historic Places in Washington (state)
National Register of Historic Places in Thurston County, Washington